The Purdy Bridge is a continuous reinforced concrete box girder bridge that spans  (with a central span of ) between Henderson Bay and Burley Lagoon, connecting Purdy, Washington, with the Purdy Sand Spit Park and Wauna, Washington. It was built on September 29, 1937, and at the time was the longest continuous box girder bridge in the United States, at a cost of $62,000 from a design by Homer M. Hadley. At the time it was built, Purdy Bridge was the first bridge in the United States to utilize a reinforced-concrete box girder design.

The bridge was added to the National Register of Historic Places in 1982.

See also
List of bridges documented by the Historic American Engineering Record in Washington (state)
List of bridges on the National Register of Historic Places in Washington (state)
List of Registered Historic Places in Washington

References

Sources

External links

Bridges completed in 1936
Historic American Engineering Record in Washington (state)
National Register of Historic Places in Pierce County, Washington
Road bridges on the National Register of Historic Places in Washington (state)
Bridges in Pierce County, Washington
Concrete bridges in the United States
Box girder bridges in the United States